In European elections, Central Italy is a constituency of the European Parliament. It consists of the regions of Lazio, Marche, Tuscany, and Umbria.

As the other Italian constituencies, it has only a procedural goal to choose the elected MEPs inside party lists, the distribution of seats between different parties being calculated at national level (called Collegio Unico Nazionale, National Single Constituency).

External links
 European Election News by European Election Law Association (Eurela)

European Parliament constituencies in Italy
1979 establishments in Italy
Constituencies established in 1979